Brandon Lee Colin Barker (born 4 October 1996) is an English professional footballer who plays as a left sided winger for Omonia in the Cypriot First Division. 

Barker has previously played for Manchester City, Rotherham United, NAC Breda, Hibernian, Preston North End, Reading and Oxford United. He has also represented England at the under-18, under-19 and under-20 international levels.

Club career

Manchester City
Barker joined the Manchester City academy at the age of eight. He was the winner of the Academy Players' Player of the Year award in the 2013–14 season and signed his first professional contract with Manchester City in July 2014. In the opening months of the 2015–16 season he appeared on the first team bench for a number of times but did not manage to make an appearance. Barker made his first-team debut for City on 21 February 2016, coming on as a substitute for Bersant Celina in a 5–1 defeat against Chelsea in the fifth round of the FA Cup.

On 6 November 2015, Barker signed for Rotherham United of the Championship on a loan with an initial length of two months. The next day he made his professional debut, playing 90 minutes and scoring in a 5–2 loss to Ipswich. On 15 December 2015, Barker was recalled from his loan by Manchester City.

In August 2016, Barker was sent to NAC Breda of the Dutch Eerste Divisie on loan for the 2016-17 season. He made his debut on 19 August, as a substitute in a 2–1 loss to Maastricht. His first goal came on 21 October, in a 3–1 win over Fortuna Sittard.

On 17 August 2017, Barker was loaned to Scottish Premiership side Hibernian for the 2017–18 season. Barker said in November that he had been encouraged to move to Scotland by the example of Patrick Roberts, a winger who had moved on loan from Manchester City to Celtic. Barker scored his first goal for Hibs in a 2–1 win against Motherwell on 31 January, but then suffered a torn hamstring in his next match. Towards the end of the season, Barker said he expected to be loaned out again by Manchester City and that he would be interested in returning to Hibs.

Barker joined Preston North End on loan for the 2018–19 season. Barker's first goal for Preston North End came in a 3–1 win over Morecambe in the EFL Cup on 14 August 2018.

Rangers
Barker signed for Rangers in August 2019. He scored his first goal for the club in his league debut at Ibrox against Livingston on 14 September 2019, scoring the third goal in a 3–1 victory. On 31 January 2022, Barker departed Rangers by mutual consent.

Oxford United (loan)
Barker joined Oxford United on loan until the end of the season on 1 February 2021. He scored three league goals for United during the 2020–21 season; his goal against Crewe on 10 April 2021 was voted the club's Goal of the Season.

Reading
On 15 February 2022, Barker joined EFL Championship side Reading on a short-term deal until the end of the 2021–22 season. On 20 May, Reading confirmed that Barker would leave the club upon the expiration of his contract.

Omonia 
On 30 June 2022, Barker joined Cypriot club Omonia on a two-year deal.

International career
Barker made his international debut for England under-18 in October 2013 and went on to play for his country at under-19 and under-20 levels.

Career statistics

Honours
Rangers
Scottish Premiership: 2020–21

Individual
Manchester City EDS Player of the Year: 2013–14

Notes and references

External links
 
 
 Brandon Barker Manchester City EDS

1996 births
Living people
English footballers
England youth international footballers
Association football midfielders
Manchester City F.C. players
Rotherham United F.C. players
NAC Breda players
Hibernian F.C. players
Preston North End F.C. players
Rangers F.C. players
Oxford United F.C. players
Reading F.C. players
AC Omonia players
English Football League players
Eredivisie players
Eerste Divisie players
Scottish Professional Football League players
English expatriate footballers
English expatriate sportspeople in the Netherlands
English expatriate sportspeople in Cyprus
Expatriate footballers in the Netherlands
Expatriate footballers in Cyprus